The Idaho Mining and Smelter Company Store, at One Ford St. in Clayton, Idaho was built in about 1880.  It was listed on the National Register of Historic Places in 2006.

It is a  plan building.  It has also been known as the Clayton Store.

References

Commercial buildings on the National Register of Historic Places in Idaho
Late 19th and Early 20th Century American Movements architecture
Commercial buildings completed in 1880
Custer County, Idaho